Matthew or Matt Ward may refer to:

 Matthew Ward (singer) (born 1958), Christian music singer
 Matthew Ward (writer) (1951–1990), American English/French translator
 Matt Ward (game designer), British author and miniature wargaming designer
 Matt Ward (lacrosse) (born 1983), American lacrosse player
 Matt Ward (record producer), UK based songwriter, record producer and remixer
 Matt Ward (footballer), English footballer
 M. Ward (born 1973), American indie folk singer-songwriter

See also
 Edward Matthew Ward (1816–1879), painter